Bir Chiranjib (Bengali: বীর চিরঞ্জীব) is the third highest peacetime gallantry award of Bangladesh.

References 

Military awards and decorations of Bangladesh